Ecclitica triorthota, also known as the kātote ugly nestmaker, is a species of moth of the family Tortricidae. It is found in New Zealand.

Description 
The mature larva is green coloured with a brown head and is at most 10 mm in length. 

The wingspan is about 14 mm. The forewings are ochreous, tinged or suffused purplish grey. There are dark ferrugineous-brown markings, suffused with dark fuscous on the edges. The hindwings are dark grey.

Behaviour 
The larva of this species creates a shelter by tying the tips of fronds of its host species together with silk.  This species ensures its shelter remains clean by flicking its waste from it. The adult moth is on the wing in December.

Hosts 
The larval host of this species is Cyathea smithii.

References

Moths described in 1927
Archipini
Moths of New Zealand